Robert Hamm (born April 24, 1959) is a former American football defensive end who played four seasons in the National Football League with the Houston Oilers, Kansas City Chiefs and Indianapolis Colts. He played college football at the University of Nevada, Reno and attended Saint Francis High School in Mountain View, California.

References

External links
Just Sports Stats

Living people
1959 births
Players of American football from Kansas City, Missouri
American football defensive ends
African-American players of American football
Nevada Wolf Pack football players
Houston Oilers players
Kansas City Chiefs players
Indianapolis Colts players
National Football League replacement players
21st-century African-American people
20th-century African-American sportspeople
Ed Block Courage Award recipients